Antonio Pellicer Paraire (1851–1916) was a Catalan writer and anarchist.

Life 

Antonio Pellicer Paraire was born on February 23, 1851, in Barcelona. Having apprenticed as a typesetter, he worked as a printer throughout his life. Through the trade, which tended towards anti-industrialism and independence, Pellicer learned about anarchist thought, such as the philosophy of Mikhail Bakunin. His extended family met Bakunin and became among the first Spanish anarchists. In 1898 he arrived in Argentina, where he played an important role in the organization of the regional anarcho-syndicalist movement, specifically in the Argentine Regional Workers' Federation.

Works 
 In the ball (En lo ball)
 Jealousy (Celos)
 Jo vaig
 The Death of the proletarian (La mort de la proletària)
 Sense Esperança
 Garibaldi. History nineteenth century liberal 
 Popular lectures on sociology

Notes

References 

 
 

Anarchists from Catalonia
Catalan-language writers
Catalan dramatists and playwrights
1851 births
1916 deaths